The Heights State Bank Building, located at 3620 Washington Street in Houston, Texas, was listed on the National Register of Historic Places on June 22, 1983.

See also
 National Register of Historic Places listings in Harris County, Texas

References

Bank buildings on the National Register of Historic Places in Texas
Buildings and structures completed in 1925
National Register of Historic Places in Houston
Renaissance Revival architecture in Texas